Gregory Owen Powell is a British stuntman, stunt coordinator, actor and 2nd unit director nominated for an Emmy Award for his work on Band of Brothers. He is also known for his work in Indian films.

Filmography 
1971: Doctor Who: Terror of the Autons – Auton Policeman (uncredited)
1972: Doctor Who: The Time Monster – Knight
2020: Soorarai Pottru: [Flight Sequence]

References

External links 

Living people
English stunt performers
1954 births